Harry Isaacs may refer to:

 Harry Isaacs (pianist) (1902–1972), British pianist
 Harry Z. Isaacs (1904–1990), American racehorse owner
 Harry Isaacs (boxer) (1908–1961), South African boxer who competed in the 1928 Summer Olympics in Amsterdam
 Harry Isaacs (1893–1958), British Jewish boxer who fought under the name Harry Reeve